Logan Ross Aikman is a former New Zealand athletics representative in the hurdles. He represented his country at the 1962 British Empire and Commonwealth Games in Perth in the 120 and 440 yards hurdles, but did not progress beyond the heats in either event. In 1964, representing Waikato, Aikman won the 120 yards hurdles title, at the New Zealand national athletics championships, with a winning time of 14.5 seconds.

References

Year of birth missing (living people)
Living people
Sportspeople from Waikato
New Zealand male hurdlers
Athletes (track and field) at the 1962 British Empire and Commonwealth Games
Commonwealth Games competitors for New Zealand